Palm Beach Atlantic University (PBA) is a private Christian university in West Palm Beach, Florida.  The university's nine colleges focus on the liberal arts with a select collection of professional studies.  In 2019, its undergraduate enrollment was approximately 2,800.

Founded in 1968, the university grew out of a local Baptist church. It operated out of assorted buildings until the first purpose-built campus building was completed in 1982. A subsidiary campus operates in Orlando. Eighteen sports teams represent the university in NCAA Division II competitions.

History 
Palm Beach Atlantic University was the vision of and was founded by Jess C. Moody in 1968 while he was the pastor of First Baptist Church of West Palm Beach.  He served until the first class graduated in 1972 and resigned from the presidency to focus on his duties at First Baptist Church. Two laymen of the church, Donald Warren and Riley Sims, became involved as trustees before the university began and continued to contribute time and support for many years. Warren served as chairman of the trustees for 38 years until 2007.

In July 1972, Warner E. Fusselle, previously president of Truett-McConnell College, became the second president of the university and led the accreditation process with the Southern Association of Colleges and Schools which was achieved in December 1972.

George Borders, Vice President of Student Affairs at Stetson University, became the third president of Palm Beach Atlantic University in 1978. He was popular with students and the Florida Baptist Convention. After his resignation in 1981 to become the president of the Florida Baptist Foundation, Claude H. Rhea became president. During his presidency, the university developed the Rinker campus and expanded its academic programs.

Paul R. Corts, previously president of Wingate College, was the fifth president of Palm Beach Atlantic. He presided over the addition of two graduate programs, from 1991 until 2002. He resigned in 2002 to accept a position as Assistant Attorney General for Administration with the United States Department of Justice.

David W Clark, President of FamilyNet, and founding provost of Regent University became the sixth President in 2003. During his presidency enrollment grew from 2,600 to 3,291. The university budget grew from $43 million to $73 million. Over 4,600 or 40 percent of all degrees were awarded during his tenure. President Clark announced his retirement during the 2008–2009 academic year the end of June.

On July 1, 2009, Lu Hardin took office as the seventh president of Palm Beach Atlantic University. A former Arkansas state senator, Hardin had previously served as the president of the University of Central Arkansas. Hardin resigned the presidency of PBA on March 4, 2011, shortly before pleading guilty in federal court in Little Rock, Arkansas, to two federal felony charges (wire fraud and money laundering) which occurred during his tenure at UCA.

On March 10, 2011, William M. B. "Bill" Fleming, Jr., the university's vice president for development, was named interim president by the university's board of trustees. After a nationwide search, Fleming, who had served as interim president for more than a year, was elected by the trustees as the university's eighth president, beginning his presidency on May 8, 2012.

Campus 

PBA's campus is located in West Palm Beach. The first structure built specifically for PBA, the W.G. Lassiter Jr. Student Center, was completed in 1982. This was followed by Johnson Hall and Sachs Hall in 1989. A new campus was established in Orlando in 2002 and in Wellington in 2002. The Wellington campus ceased operations in 2017.

Residence halls include Oceanview Hall, Rinker Hall, Baxter Hall, Johnson Hall, Weyenberg Hall, Flagler Towers Apartments, Samaritan Gardens Apartments, Coastal Towers Apartments, Lakeview Apartments, and Mango Apartments.

Classroom buildings include the Vera Lea Rinker School of Music and Fine Arts, the Lloyd L. Gregory School of Pharmacy, Borbe Hall, MacArthur Hall, Rinker Hall, Pembroke Hall, Oceanview Hall, The Greene Complex for Sports and Recreation, and the Okeechobee Building.

A continuous building program has characterized the last decade of growth at Palm Beach Atlantic University. In January 2007 the first phase of the state-of-the-art . Warren Library was dedicated. The building is named after Donald Warren, who served as the first chairman of the board of trustees for 38 years. The university has an extension campus in Orlando offering adult and graduate degrees.

A permanent home for Sailfish athletics is in the form of a 78-acre Marshall and Vera Lea Rinker Athletic Campus at 3401 Parker Avenue in West Palm Beach  — just a short drive from Palm Beach Atlantic University. The campus, located between I-95 and Parker Avenue just north of Southern Boulevard, provides facilities for training and hosting intercollegiate and intramural and club sport competitions. The facility opened in September 2014 and was completed in August 2017.
 The athletic campus includes lighted competition baseball, softball and soccer fields, an intramural softball field, Mitch Gornto Tennis Center with 12 match courts and one championship court. Outdoor basketball, racquetball and sand volleyball courts are to be completed at a later date.

Academics 

Palm Beach Atlantic University offers more than 50 undergraduate and graduate programs through nine schools:

Rinker School of Business
School of Arts and Sciences
School of Communication and Media 
School of Education and Behavioral Studies
MacArthur School of Leadership
School of Ministry
School of Music and Fine Arts
School of Nursing
Gregory School of Pharmacy

Frederick M. Supper Honors Program 
The university offers an honors program through the Frederick M. Supper Honors Program. Students in this program read primary texts and take part in Socratic dialogue to understand the predominant and defining ideologies of the major historical epochs. The program seeks not only to provide a rigorous education in the liberal arts, but also to incorporate students into the Great Conversation among writers of the Western canon.

The Centers of Excellence 
Palm Beach Atlantic University has five centers of excellence that provide opportunities for students to gain expertise in their given field.

Gregory Center for Medical Missions: The Gregory Center for Medical Missions collaborates with other medical mission organizations, works to develop best practices and trains individuals.
The LeMieux Center for Public Policy: Established by former senator George LeMieux in 2012, The LeMieux Center provides opportunities for students to engage with state and national elected officials, journalists, authors and other notable leaders. The center also hosts a notable lecture series through the academic school year and manages a fellows program.
David and Leighan Rinker Center for Experiential Learning: The Center for Experiential Learning provides academic travel experiences for university students.
Center for Integrative Science Learning: The center works with local elementary, middle and high schools to incorporate scientific principles all grade levels.
The Titus Center for Franchising: Titus Center offers academic coursework, internships, job shadowing and training at area franchises, including the global headquarters of United Franchise Group in West Palm Beach, Florida. Dr. John P. Hayes is the center's director.

Ministry life 
Chapel is held four times weekly in the DeSantis Family Chapel, Monday through Thursday at 11 a.m., as well as other times, dates and locations that are listed on the chapel calendar. 
Chapel is a requirement for all full-time undergrad students. Students must attend 24 chapels per year.

"Workship" is the school's community service program that seeks to "respond to human needs with Faith-filled action in the community and throughout the world," with the intention that such community service might help students discern their vocation and develop a lifelong habit of servant leadership.

Mission Trips are offered yearly for students. Mission teams travel to countries all over the world and minister through evangelism, performing arts, street ministries, construction, medical outreach, sports workshops and more. The teams travel during the summer on a multi-week trip and on a one-week Spring Break trip.

Athletics 

The Palm Beach Atlantic athletic teams are called the Sailfish. The school's colors are navy blue and white. The university is a member of the NCAA Division II ranks, primarily competing in the Sunshine State Conference (SSC) since the 2015–16 academic year as a provisional member for most their sports (achieving D-II full member status in 2016–17); while its men's and women's track & field teams compete as NCAA D-II Independents as the conference does not sponsor these sports. The Sailfish previously competed as an NCAA D-II Independent from 2003–04 to 2014–15; and in the Florida Sun Conference (FSC; now currently known as the Sun Conference since the 2008–09 school year) of the National Association of Intercollegiate Athletics (NAIA) from 1990–91 to 2002–03.

Palm Beach Atlantic competes in 18 intercollegiate varsity sports: Men's sports include baseball, basketball, cross country, golf, lacrosse, soccer, tennis and track & field; while women's sports include basketball, beach volleyball, cross country, golf, lacrosse, soccer, softball, tennis, track & field and volleyball.

Facilities 
The new Marshall and Vera Lea Rinker Athletic Campus has beach volleyball, soccer, lacrosse, baseball, softball, tennis, and running trails as well as a new state of the art weight and training rooms. The new  building houses locker rooms, meeting rooms as well as athletic offices.

Notable alumni 
 Tenth Avenue North - Contemporary Christian music band
 Lizbeth Benacquisto - Current member of the Florida Senate
 Victoria Jackson - Actress and former Saturday Night Live cast member
 Martin David Kiar - Broward County Property Appraiser
 Ruthie Ann Miles - Broadway actress, 2015 Tony Award winner for The King & I
 Jennifer Rothschild - Author and speaker
 Susan Sherouse - American violinist
 Priscilla Taylor - Current member of the Florida House of Representatives
 Brian Mast (attended) - Current member, U.S. House of Representatives

References

External links 
 
 Official athletics website

 
Educational institutions established in 1968
Universities and colleges accredited by the Southern Association of Colleges and Schools
Buildings and structures in West Palm Beach, Florida
Universities and colleges in Palm Beach County, Florida
Evangelicalism in Florida
1968 establishments in Florida
Council for Christian Colleges and Universities
Private universities and colleges in Florida